Philipp Martin Max (born 30 September 1993) is a German footballer who plays as a left back for  club Eintracht Frankfurt on loan from the Dutch club PSV, and the Germany national team.

Club career

Schalke 04
Max joined Schalke 04 in 2010 from Bayern Munich. He made his Bundesliga debut on 25 March 2014 against Borussia Dortmund, coming in for Julian Draxler.

Karlsruher SC
On 30 April 2014, he signed a three-year contract with Karlsruher SC, effective the following season.

FC Augsburg
On 4 August 2015, Max joined FC Augsburg on a two-year contract with an option to extend the agreement, for a reported fee of €3.6 million. Max scored his first goal for Augsburg in a 4–0 victory over 
Hamburger SV in the Bundesliga on 30 April 2017. He finished the 2017–18 Bundesliga season with 2 goals and 12 assists for Augsburg With 12 assists, he became the 2nd top assist provider in the league only behind Bayern's Thomas Müller who had 14 assists. In December 2018, in a 2–2 draw with Hertha BSC, he made his 100th league appearance for Augsburg. On 13 December 2019, Max scored a brace away to TSG Hoffenheim while playing on the left wing, as regular winger Ruben Vargas was serving a one-game suspension. Max scored another brace in their next game, a win over Fortuna Düsseldorf, also while on the wing.

PSV Eindhoven
On 2 September 2020, Max joined PSV Eindhoven.

Loan to Eintracht Frankfurt
On 31 January 2023, Max moved to Eintracht Frankfurt on loan with an option to buy.

International career
He was part of the squad for the 2016 Summer Olympics, where Germany won the silver medal. He earned his first call-up for the senior team on 6 November 2020. His debut came on 11 November 2020, in a friendly game against the Czech Republic.

Personal life
He is the son of former German international striker Martin Max.

Career statistics

Club

International

Honours
PSV
KNVB Cup: 2021–22
Johan Cruyff Shield: 2021, 2022

Germany
Summer Olympics Silver medal: 2016

References

External links

1993 births
German people of Polish descent
People from Viersen
Sportspeople from Düsseldorf (region)
Footballers from North Rhine-Westphalia
Living people
German footballers
Olympic footballers of Germany
Germany international footballers
Association football fullbacks
FC Schalke 04 players
FC Schalke 04 II players
Karlsruher SC players
FC Augsburg players
PSV Eindhoven players
Eintracht Frankfurt players
Regionalliga players
Bundesliga players
2. Bundesliga players
Eredivisie players
Footballers at the 2016 Summer Olympics
Medalists at the 2016 Summer Olympics
Olympic silver medalists for Germany
Olympic medalists in football
German expatriate footballers
German expatriate sportspeople in the Netherlands
Expatriate footballers in the Netherlands